Patricia Schlesinger (born  in Hanover, Germany) is a German journalist, television presenter, former director of national broadcaster Rundfunk Berlin-Brandenburg (RBB), and former chair of public broadcast network ARD.

In 2022, Schlesinger resigned both the directorship and the chair after allegations of embezzlement were made public.

References 

1961 births
Living people
German women television journalists
German women television presenters

de:Patricia Schlesinger